The Hayel Saeed Anam & Co. is a multi-billion dollar conglomerate active in the Middle East, North Africa, the Horn of Africa, Europe, and South East Asia. The group is owned and managed by the Saeed Anam family. The group today has grown to own over 92 companies in various regions, including Saudi Arabia, the United Kingdom, Malaysia, Indonesia, the United Arab Emirates, Bahrain, Jordan, Iraq, Egypt, Yemen, Djibouti, and Ethiopia.

History 
The history of the group dates back to 1938, when Hayel Saeed Anam and his brothers founded a retail store in Aden, Yemen. Five years later, they founded an import and export company based in Aden. In 1950, they expanded their business in Northern Yemen through opening stores in Mocha and Taiz. In 1952, the company was incorporated as Hayel Saeed Anam and Partners.

Criticism
	 
In 2018, Greenpeace claimed to have documented large scale deforestation in areas, which have been given an extra level of legal protection from  deforestation and are controlled by subsidiaries of the Hayel Saeed Anam Group (Arma Foods and Pacific Oils and Fats). Following these accusations, Unilever suspended placement of any new orders from HSA's Group subsidiaries until the allegations have been satisfactorily addressed by them. The HSA Group has not responded to request for comment by The Daily Telegraph.

Reaction to the COVID-19 outbreak

The International Initiative on COVID-19 in Yemen (IICY) was founded, amongst others, by the charity arm of the HSA Group with the goal to improve the limited testing capabilities for the SARS-CoV-2 in Yemen. The IICY said in a statement that the first 34-tonne shipment contained 49,000 virus collection kits, 20,000 rapid test kits, five centrifuges and equipment that would enable 85,000 tests, and 24,000 COVID-19 nucleic acid test kits. The air-borne shipment arrived in Yemen on 19 June 2020.

References

External links

 
 

Companies of Yemen
Conglomerate companies of the United Arab Emirates
Conglomerate companies established in 1938